Lam Thamenchai is a district (amphoe) of Nakhon Ratchasima province, northeastern Thailand.

History
The area of Lam Thamenchai was separated from Chum Phuang district and made a minor district (king amphoe) on 15 July 1996.

On 15 May 2007, all 81 minor districts were upgraded to full districts. On 24 August the upgrade became official.

Geography
Neighboring districts are (from the east clockwise): Khu Mueang and Lam Plai Mat of Buriram province; Chum Phuang and Mueang Yang of Nakhon Ratchasima Province.

The district is named after the Thamenchai River, the main river of the district.

Administration
The district is divided into four subdistricts (tambons). The township (thesaban tambon) of Nong Bua Wong covers parts of the tambons Kui and Phlai.

References

External links
amphoe.com

Lam Thamenchai